Changping or Chang Ping, may refer to:

Transportation
Changping station (Beijing Subway) (昌平), a subway station on Changping line of Beijing Subway. Located in Beijing.
Changping line (昌平线), a subway line of Beijing Subway
Changping railway station (Beijing) (昌平), a railway station in Beijing.
Changping railway station (Guangdong) (常平), a railway station in Dongguan, Guangdong province.
Changping station (Guangzhou Metro) (长平), a metro station on Line 21 of Guangzhou Metro. Located in Guangzhou, Guangdong province.

People
Lord Changping (died 223 BC), the last king of Chu
Princess Changping (1629–1646), princess of the Ming Dynasty
 Chang Ping

Places
Changping District, Beijing
Changping, Guangdong, town in and subdivision of Dongguan, Guangdong
Changping, Hubei, town in and subdivision of Nanzhang County, Hubei
Changping, Nanbu County, town in subdivision of Nanbu County, Sichuan

Townships
Changping Township, Fusui County, Guangxi
Changping Township, Henan, subdivision of Qinyang, Henan
Written as ""
, subdivision of Wanzhou District, Chongqing
, subdivision of Songtao County, Guizhou
, subdivision of Leiyang City, Hunan.
, subdivision of Jinggangshan City, Jiangxi
, subdivision of Tongjiang County, Sichuan
, Mengshan County, Guangxi

Other uses
Battle of Changping, campaign of the Warring States Period of China

See also
 Chang (disambiguation)
 Ping (disambiguation)
 Pingchang (disambiguation)